They Flock Like Vulcans To See Old Jupiter Eyes On His Home Craters is the 37th studio album by King Creosote, released in 2008.

Track listing
On Esther's Planet     
No One Had It Better      
Ear Against The Wireless     
Houston Tharoule      
A Mighty Din Of 'What If?'s     
Think Elephant    
Dead Mouse Diary      
44BC      
Home Creatures   
The Minter Scale     
It's Going To End In Tears    
All Mine

2008 albums
King Creosote albums